Estela Navascués (born 3 February 1981) is a Spanish long distance runner. She competed in the marathon at the 2016 Summer Olympics, but failed to finish. She took up athletics in 1997 and started competing internationally in 2010.

Achievements

References

External links

 

1981 births
Living people
Spanish female long-distance runners
Spanish female marathon runners
Place of birth missing (living people)
Athletes (track and field) at the 2016 Summer Olympics
Olympic athletes of Spain
Spanish female cross country runners
21st-century Spanish women